"How We Do It (Around My Way)" is the first single from R&B singer Lloyd's third studio album Lessons in Love, and features rapper Ludacris. It was sent to US radio stations on March 4, 2008.

A first version of the track, originally titled "How We Do It (In the A)", was leaked to the Internet in February 2008. The video was shot on April 12, 2008,the video debuted on Yahoo! Music on April 28, 2008.

.

Formats and track listings
UK CD single 
 "How We Do It (Around My Way)" (Original)
 "How We Do It (Around My Way)" (Wideboys Mix)
 "How We Do It (Around My Way)" (Rekless Mix)

Remix
There is also an official remix of the song called "How We Do (In the UK)" and features UK hip-hop artist Sway DaSafo.
It was premiered on 1xtra by Ronnie Herel on 16 June 2008. Lloyd's verses in the song are exactly the same except he sings "How we do in the UK" during the chorus rather than "How we do around my way".

"How We Do It (In the UK)" is featured as a bonus track on the UK edition of Lessons in Love.

Other versions
"How We Do It (In the A)"
"How We Do It (In the UK)"

Chart position

References

2008 singles
Lloyd (singer) songs
Ludacris songs
Songs written by Lloyd (singer)
2007 songs
Songs written by Ludacris